Tamás Almási (born 26 July 1948 in Székesfehérvár) is one of the most well known and most successful Hungarian documentary film directors. He directs but sometimes also photographs his own films. So far he has made more than forty full-length documentaries and some movie fiction films, which have been screened at a number of highly prestigious festivals in Europe and overseas earning him numerous awards. His films have been broadcast around forty countries. He has been awarded the highest Hungarian artistic distinction the Kossuth price.

He graduated at the University of Theatre and Film Arts, Budapest as a film director in 1979. He has also been teaching filmmaking at the University of Theatre and Film Arts, Budapest since 1999. In 2005 he obtained his DLA (Doctor of Liberal Arts). Currently he is a professor at this university. He is best known for the Ózd Series, a series of documentaries about the Ózd steelworks.

Selected filmography 
tititá (Original title -tititá) (documentary film) (2015) (Writer, Producer, Director)
Puskás Hungary (Original title - Puskás Hungary) (documentary film) (2009) (Director)
Mario the Magician (Original title - Márió a varázsló) (feature film) (2008) (Screenplay, Director)
Our Own Little Europe (Original title - A mi kis Európánk) (documentary film) (2006) (Cinematographer)
From Home to Home (Original title -Valahol otthon lenni) (documentary film) (2003) (Cinematographer, Director)
From Home to Home (Original title -Valahol otthon lenni) (3x55 min.TV series) (2003)
The end of the Road (Original title - Az út vége) (documentary film) (2003) (Cinematographer, Writer, Director)
Kitüntetetten (Documentary) (2002) (Producer, Director)
Our Cells  (Original title - Sejtjeink) (documentary film ) (2002) (Cinematographer, Director)
Down and out (Original title - Alagsor) (documentary film) (2001) (Cinematographer, Writer, Producer, Editor, Director)
More than love  (Original title - Szerelem első hallásra) (documentary film) (1999)
Helpless / Sans espoir  (Original title - Tehetetlenül) (documentary film) (1998) (Cinematographer, Director
The matter of the heart / Mon affaire de coeur (Original title - Szívügyem) (documentary film) (1996) (Cinematographer, Editor, Director)
Barren / Déchets (Original title - Meddő) (documentary film) (1995)
Találkozás (1994) Director
The Factory is Ours (Original title - Miénk a gyár) (documentary film) (1993) (Cinematographer, Director)
Lassítás (Documentary) (1992) (Director)
Women condemned  (Original title - Ítéletlenül) (documentary film) (1991) (Studio chief, Director)
In a vise / L’etau (Original title - Szorításban ) (documentary film) (1987)
Hajdúszoboszlói képek (Documentary short) (1983) (Writer, Director)
I was your kid  (Original title - Kölyköd voltam) (documentary film) (1983) (Director)
Van közünk hozzá (documentary short) (1983) (Writer, Director)
Graduation (Original title - Ballagás) (feature film) (1980) (Writer, Director)
Circus maximus (1980) (Co-director)
How long does the tree live? (Original title - Meddig él egy fa?) (short feature film) (1976)
Tűzgömbök (1975) (Assistant to director) 
The Fortress (Original title - Az erőd) (1979) (assistant director)
141 Minutes from the Unfinished Sentence (Original title - 141 perc a befejezetlen mondatból (1975) (assistant director)
25 Fireman's Street (Original title - Tűzoltó utca 25.) (1973) (assistant director)
One Day More, One Day Less (Original title - Plusz-mínusz egy nap (1973) (assistant director)
Meztelen vagy (1972) (assistant director)
Red Psalm (Original title - Még kér a nép (1972) (second assistant director)

Hungarian Film Festivals, Awards 
Main Prize Documentary Film Category, Hungarian Film Week 6 times: 1993, 1998, 1999, 2000, 2002, 2010
Hungarian Film Critiques' Award: 1993, 1997, 1999, 2003, 2010
Best First Film, Special Award, Hungarian Film Week 1981
Main Prize, Category Prize, Camera Hungaria 1999
Category Prize, Camera Hungaria 2010
Main Prize, Best Documentary Prize, Television Festival at Miskolc 1988

International Film Festivals, Awards 
Special Jury Prize, 2015 – 21st Sarajevo Film Festival
Main Prize 54. Semana International De Cine, Valladolid 2009
Silver Remy Prize, Houston World Fest 2009
Prage, Bratislava: One World Festival (2009.)
Wien: Human World Film Festival (2009.)
Cairo International Film Festival 2008
Gold Prize of the Jury, Houston World Fest 2005
Qualification for the competition 75th Annual Academy Awards 2003
2004: Copenhagen International Documentary Film Festival
2004: 8th Jihlava International Documentary Film Festival, Market
FIPA, Biarritz 1997, 2002
Special mention of Prix International de la SCAM, Cinema du Réel, Paris 1999
Silver Plaque, International Television Competition, Chicago 1998
Golden Gate Awards, Certificate of Merit, San Francisco 1997
Special mention for documentary Karlovy Vary 1997
Documentary Awards Special Commendation, Prix Italia Television Naples 1996
Prix Europa, Berlin 1992, 1996
Silver Sestertius Award, Nyon Documentary Festival 1992
Prix Italia, Bologna 2001
Prix Italia, Parma 1992
INPUT festival (1987, 1992)
Main Prize Cilect Festival, Washington 1978

Professional awards 
2010 Kossuth award - Hungary's highest cultural award
2005 Outstanding Artist of the Hungarian Republic
2003 Honorary Citizen of the City of Székesfehérvár
2002 Order of Merit of the Hungarian Republic Knight’s Cross
1999 Pulitzer Memorial Prize in Hungary
1998 Award for Hungarian Culture
1998 Bezerédj-Award
1995 Balázs Béla Award

References

External links

1948 births
Living people
Hungarian film directors